Richard Roth may refer to:
 Richard Roth (CBS News journalist) (born 1949), American journalist for CBS News
 Richard Roth (journalist) (born 1955), American journalist for CNN
 Richard Roth (politician) (born 1950), American politician
 Dick Roth (Richard William Roth, born 1947), American swimmer

See also
 Rick Roth, member of the Florida House of Representatives